Olga Petrovna Kuzhela (born 29 August 1985 in Leningrad) is a Russian competitor in synchronized swimming. She won a gold medal in team competition at the 2008 Summer Olympics.

References

External links
 The Official Website of the Beijing 2008 Olympic Games

Swimmers from Saint Petersburg
Olympic gold medalists for Russia
Russian synchronized swimmers
Olympic synchronized swimmers of Russia
Synchronized swimmers at the 2008 Summer Olympics
Living people
1985 births
Olympic medalists in synchronized swimming
Medalists at the 2008 Summer Olympics